Fort Frederiksborg, later Fort Royal, was a Danish and later English fort on the Gold Coast in contemporary Ghana. It was built in 1661, with the approval of the King of Fetu, a few hundred yards from Cape Coast Castle, which was at that time in Swedish hands, on Amanfro Hill. Along with several other castles and forts nearby, Fort Frederiksborg was inscribed on the World Heritage List in 1979 because of its testimony to European economic influence on West Africa and the Atlantic slave trade.

History

Frederiksborg was a small  fort from which Cape Coast Castle could easily be bombarded. It functioned for a short time as the headquarters of the Danish West India Company on the Danish Gold Coast, before it was moved to Christiansborg Castle in Osu.

In 1665 the English Royal African Company took over Cape Coast Castle and reinforced it to use it as their new headquarters. The Danes had little use of their fort. The fort was first pawned to the English in 1679 before it was finally sold to them in 1685.

The English reconstructed the fort in 1699 and renamed it Fort Royal. They soon abandoned it again, however.

References

Sources
 

Buildings and structures completed in 1661
Danish Gold Coast
History of Ghana
Castles in Ghana
1661 establishments in Africa
1661 establishments in the Danish colonial empire
Frederiksborg